Jesse Aaron Dwyre is a Canadian actor, musician and writer. Jesse has appeared in film, theatre and television. He currently plays Henry is HBO's crime series Jett, and Young Hogarth in His Masters Voice. He has starred in independent films Imitation (film) and Adam's Wall. He has drummed since the age of five primarily with the rock group Stylewinder.

Training

Jesse Dwyre is a graduate of the National Theatre School in Montreal, The Birmingham Conservatory for Classical Theatre Training in Stratford, and the inaugural class of the Canadian Film Centre Actors Conservatory which was originally chaired by Kiefer Sutherland.

Stage

Most recently Jesse appeared as Joseph in Luigi_Pirandello's 'The Vise' in Stratford Ontario. 'The Vise' was staged and adapted by Douglas Beattie, the director of Wingfield fame.

Jesse's other stage appearances have taken him across Canada where he has performed at:  The Stratford Festival (Romeo and Juliet, Love's Labour's Lost, Caesar and Cleopatra with Christopher Plummer, Three Sisters directed by Martha Henry, and was featured as Ezekiel Edgeworth the stealthy cutpurse in Bartholomew Fair directed by Antoni Cimolino. For Soulpepper (Great Expectations, Farther West), for the Segal Centre for Performing Arts Jesse played Rothko's assistant Ken in Red (play) directed by Martha Henry. For Theatre Calgary (Of the Fields Lately, Counsellor-at-Law), Alberta Theatre Projects (World Premiere of Get Away), for Tarragon Theatre (The Ugly One). He has also performed at the Grand Theatre and Driftwood Theatre as Lysander in A Midsummer Night's Dream, Trofimov in the Guildwood Theatre Festival's production of The Cherry Orchard, the Thousand Islands Playhouse and at Black Theatre Workshop in World Premiere of Blacks Don't Bowl.

In classic novels adapted to the stage, Jesse has played; Bernard Marx in Aldous Huxley's (Brave New World) at Theatre Passe Muraille. He also played Oscar the protagonist in the monumental German tale The Tin Drum for Unspun Theatre. Dwyre was the first actor to portray Shade the lead role in the world premiere of Silverwing by Canadian author Kenneth Oppel at Manitoba Theatre for Young People in Winnipeg.

Jesse's work has garnered Award nominations from the Betty Mitchell Awards, the Montreal Masques, Toronto's Dora Mavor Moore Awards, MyEntertainment.com Awards and the Stratford Festival's Tyrone Guthrie Awards Committee. He has taken home two Dora Awards, a Tyrone Guthrie Award and two My Entertainment World Awards

Feature film
In Imitation (film), a movie directed by Frederico Hidalgo, Jesse played the role of Fenton, a grocery-store stock boy in Montreal who wants to help Teresa (played by Vanessa Bauche) who is searching for her husband. This emotionally ambitious and frequently comedic feature follows the two as they travel across Montreal, often encountering colourful characters who lead them to the moment, where Teresa will have more explaining to do than she ever expected.

Adam's Wall is a tale of forbidden love between a Jewish boy and a Lebanese girl directed by Michael Mackenzie and produced by Ziad Touma of Couzin Films. Jesse Aaron Dwyre stars in the role of Adam Levy, a Jewish teenager from Montreal's Mile-End district. Adam falls head over heels in love with a pretty young Lebanese girl Yasmine Gibran (played by Flavia Bechara), only to find himself torn between his Orthodox upbringing and his devotion to the captivating beauty. The Toronto Star cited it is a story that brings 'Lovers Together who are Still Miles ApartShort film
In The Archivist Jesse plays Cedric a new assistant projectionist at an aging movie theatre who risks confrontation with his supervisor when he investigates a series of mysterious disappearances. The film was written and directed by Jeremy Ball and shot by cinematographer Guy Godfree, as a tribute to the stylings of H.P.Lovecraft and also celebrates the 100th anniversary of the Elgin and Winter Garden Theatres in Toronto.Silas & the Tomb is a short film written by and starring Jesse Dwyre. Set in the late nineteenth century, it is the tale of a lowly undertaker who cuts corners and cannot seem to bury his mistakes. The film was adapted from H.P.Lovecraft's The Vault and it stylistically spans both the silent film comedy and horror genres. The BRAVO! network supplied funding through its Bravo!FACT program.

Jesse has also appeared in short films; Dangerous Heroes by Svjetlana Jaklenec, The Cats by Hakan Oztan, The Fursteneau Mysteries by Illya Klymkiw.

Television
Jesse's television appearances include: Henry in HBO's upcoming crime drama JETT. Jesse has also played Romeo in Bravo's Shakespeare in Words and Music, NBC's 10.5: Apocalypse, Cine Qua Non's Mary Shelley, CBS's  Beauty & the Beast and Clementine, and CBC's The Fifth Estate among others.

Music
Jesse began drumming at the age of five. He later became an ardent student of the drumset with keen interest on jazz and Brazilian rhythms. He has recorded with and/or backed performers in Montreal, Kingston, Stratford and Toronto. Jesse has swung with the Montreal Gypsy-Jazz Ensemble who pay tribute to the music of Django Reinhardt, he has played with the Apartment 5 Swing Band headed by TJ Collins (formerly of the Asexuals (band)). Jesse also was a member of the Trespassers with Lucy Peacock (actress) of Stratford Festival notoriety. 
Jesse has recorded drums and percussion for multi-instrumentalist Jeremy Daw and for Gospel recording artist Roxanne Mandy Flagler.

Dwyre has co-written and recorded two full length albums with 'Stylewinder'; a high energy indie-pop-punk outfit who released Omnivigant in 2000 and the followed it with Incidental Music'' in 2002. All of the 'Stylewinder' sessions were recorded, mixed and mastered at Summit Sound Studios.

Filmography
2019:  Jett in the role of Henry
2017/18: His Masters Voice in the role of Young Hogarth
2014: The Archivist in the role of Cedric
2014: Beauty & the Beast in the role of Colin
2011: Fursteneau Mysteries cast in role of Small
2010: Silas & the Tomb in the role of Silas
2009: The Cats in the role of the Detective
2009: Caesar & Cleopatra in the role of Major Domo
2008: Adam's Wall in the role of Adam Levy
2006: Imitation in role of Fenton
2006: (NBC TV) 10.5 Apocalypse in role of Dr. Josh Nolan
2005: Fries With That playing the role of the Greaser
2004: Mary Shelley playing role of Leigh Hunt
2000: Dangerous Heroes in the role of James

Musicography
2002: Incidental Music by "Stylewinder"
2000: Omnivigant album by "Stylewinder")

Family
Jesse Aaron Joseph Dwyre was born in Kingston and grew up in the small mill town of Lyndhurst Ontario. He has one younger brother, Joshua Lucas Dwyre, his mother's name is Sandra (née Webb) and his father is William Joseph Dwyre.

References

External links

JETT Official IMDB
SILAS & THE TOMB Short Film
Silas & the Tomb IMDB
THE ARCHIVIST Short Film 
The ARCHIVIST IMDB
ADAMS WALL trailer
10.5 Apocalypse Trailer (feat. Jesse Dwyre)
Imitation trailer

Living people
Year of birth missing (living people)
Canadian male film actors
Canadian rock drummers
Canadian male drummers